Thomas Hill (born 4 March 1974) is an Australian judoka. He won a gold medal at the 2002 Commonwealth Games and competed at the 2000 Summer Olympics, where he was eliminated in the first bout. He has been Australian Champion nine times.

Personal life
Thomas also has 6 children who are also rising judo stars.

See also

Hill family
List of Commonwealth Games medallists in judo

References

1974 births
Living people
Sportspeople from Canberra
Sportsmen from the Australian Capital Territory
Australian male judoka
Olympic judoka of Australia
Judoka at the 2000 Summer Olympics
Commonwealth Games medallists in judo
Commonwealth Games gold medallists for Australia
Thomas
Judoka at the 2002 Commonwealth Games
20th-century Australian people
21st-century Australian people
Medallists at the 2002 Commonwealth Games